Popmoney is a person-to-person payments service (P2P) developed by CashEdge (now part of Fiserv) and launched in December 2010.  The service enables individuals to send and receive payments electronically in a manner that is designed to displace traditional check payments. In 2018, some banks began to replace popmoney with Zelle.

The name "Popmoney" is an acronym for "pay other people money".

Function
Popmoney differs from other person-to-person payment services in the manner that transactions take place.  Popmoney transactions execute from the sender's checking account to the receiver's checking account directly; there is no requirement for a stored-value account for either participant.

Transactions executed through popmoney.com cost $1.00 each. Generally, transactions take 1–3 days, but in April 2013 real-time payments were enabled in certain circumstances.

Integration with Zashpay
Fiserv's acquisition of CashEdge necessitated integration between Fiserv's Zashpay P2P service and Popmoney. Prior to acquisition, Zashpay had more than 1,400 financial institutions signed up.  Popmoney retained fewer financial institutions, but those that it did were significantly larger.

Bank integrations
Popmoney has enabled single sign-on capability with over 1,400 financial institutions.

Criticism
In 2012, Consumerist criticized Popmoney because not all types of bank accounts can receive payments from Popmoney. Additionally, Popmoney makes it difficult for a user to close their account. Users are allowed to create accounts online, but per the terms of service are required to send account closure requests via postal mail in order to terminate their account.

References

Electronic funds transfer